Akimiski Island is the largest island in James Bay (a southeasterly extension of Hudson Bay), Canada, which is part of the Qikiqtaaluk Region of the territory of Nunavut. From the western side of the island, the Ontario coastline is visible.

The island's name is Swampy Cree for "land across the water".

The island has no year-round human inhabitants.  The surface of Akimiski is flat and slopes gradually to the north. Most of the vegetation that covers the island consists of lichen, moss, sedges, and dwarf black spruce. The island is a coastal wetland that includes mudflats, tidal marshes, and tidal mudflats. Freshwater streams that flow into southwestern James Bay carry sediments and abundant nutrients that help to sustain the productive waterfowl habitat around Akimiski Island.

The Akimiski Island Group includes Akimiski, Gasket, and Gullery islands; Albert Shoal; and the Akimiski Strait Isles.

Climate

 Mean annual temperature: 
 Average rainfall: 
 Average snowfall:

Conservation

Akimiski Island is the site of the Akimiski Island Migratory Bird Sanctuary, a Canadian Important Bird Area, site #NU036. Its eastern portion is also a federal Migratory Bird Sanctuary, and much of the coastline is a Key Migratory Bird Terrestrial Habitat site.

Fauna
The coastal waters and wetlands of Akimiski Island (and James Bay in general) are important feeding grounds for many varieties of migratory birds. Notable species include:
 Atlantic brant
 Canada goose
 Lesser snow goose
 Marbled godwit
 Semipalmated sandpiper

Because James Bay and Hudson Bay are funnel-shaped, migrating birds from the Arctic concentrate in this area. During fall migration, an abundance of birds with both adults and young are present. In the springtime, the birds tend to reside in the southern areas of James Bay until the northern section thaws.

Among mammals, ringed seals, polar bears, and beluga whales can be found in the area.

References

Further reading

 Hill, Michael Robert John. Factors Influencing Pre- and Post-Fledging Growth and Survival of Canada Goose Goslings on Akimiski Island, Nunavut. Ottawa: National Library of Canada = Bibliothèque nationale du Canada, 2000.

External links 
 NASA Photo : "STS085-713-070 Akimiski Island, Northwest Territory, Canada August 1997 Akimiski Island, a 2000-square-mile (5180 square kilometers) uninhabited island, is the largest island in James Bay (a southeasterly extension of Hudson Bay)."

Islands of James Bay
Uninhabited islands of Qikiqtaaluk Region
Nature conservation in Nunavut